Arilophia is a genus of moths in the family Geometridae.

Ennominae
Geometridae genera